United States gubernatorial elections were held in 1900, in 34 states, concurrent with the House, Senate elections and presidential election, on November 6, 1900 (except in Alabama, Arkansas, Georgia, Louisiana, Maine, North Carolina, Rhode Island and Vermont, which held early elections).

Alabama held its last gubernatorial election in August, while Rhode Island held its last in April. In both cases the next gubernatorial election would be held on the same day as federal elections: in Alabama in 1902 and in Rhode Island in 1901. There was a change in Alabama's governorships in 1902, when governors served four-year terms instead of two-year terms.

In Florida, the gubernatorial election was held on the same day as federal elections, having been held in October since 1892.

In North Carolina gubernatorial elections had been held on the same day as federal elections since 1876, but in 1900 it was moved to August. It would revert to November from 1904.

Results

See also 
1900 United States elections

References

Notes

Bibliography 
 
 
 
 
 

 
November 1900 events